Rupchand Murmu (born 3 November 1947) is an Indian politician and a member of the Communist Party of India (Marxist) political party. He was elected to the 10th Lok Sabha in 1991 from Jhargram constituency in West Bengal. He was re-elected to the Lok Sabha in 1996, 1998, 1999 and 2004 from the same constituency.

External links
 Official biographical sketch in Parliament of India website

1947 births
Living people
Santali people
Communist Party of India (Marxist) politicians from West Bengal
People from Paschim Medinipur district
India MPs 2004–2009
India MPs 1991–1996
India MPs 1996–1997
India MPs 1998–1999
India MPs 1999–2004
Lok Sabha members from West Bengal